Nanaimo/Long Lake Water Airport  is located in the Wellington area of Nanaimo, British Columbia, Canada. It is classified as an airport by Nav Canada and is subject to regular inspections by Transport Canada.

See also
 List of airports on Vancouver Island

References

Seaplane bases in British Columbia
Transport in Nanaimo
Certified airports in British Columbia